"Chihuahua" is a song recorded by Swiss artist DJ BoBo. It was the first single from his tenth album, Visions, and was released in late 2002 and early 2003 in many countries. It was his most successful single, topping the charts in France, Spain and Switzerland and becoming the summer hit of the year. It can also be considered as DJ BoBo's signature song.

History

Background 
The song "Chihuahua" is based on Latin pop hit single of the same name by Louis Oliveira and His Bandodalua Boys.

Hit success and releases 
The song became the sixth best-selling single of the 21st century in France, with 1.020.000 units sold.

"Chihuahua" also features on DJ BoBo's compilations Chihuahua (2002) and Greatest Hits (2006), and on the live albums Live in Concert (2003) and Vampires Are Alive – The Show (2008).

Videoclip and usage in the media 
There were two music videos, the first one having been produced as an animated feature.
The song, which was accompanied with a choreographed dance, was used for a French TV advert for Coca-Cola.

Cover versions
In the same year, the song was covered by The Booming People, and achieved a moderate success (#60 in France, No. 3 in Belgium (Flanders) and No. 2 in Belgium (Wallonia). Also in 2003, Brazilian singer Eliana covered this song as "Meu Cachorrinho (Chihuahua)" and released as a single, with new lyrics written in Portuguese.

In December 2004, "Chihuahua" was covered by Cantopop singer Joey Yung. In 2005, Greek band Candy Girls recorded a Greek version of the song. In 2008, the Belgian child trio Dalton Sisters covered the song in Dutch for the Dutch version of Beverly Hills Chihuahua.

In 2004, Doraemon and the Gang covered this song with the same lyrics as the original, and put it on the disc with the same name. The difference in the beginning is Doraemon saying "Shizuka, Giant, Nobita, Suneo, Let's dance!"

Track listings

 CD single
 "Chihuahua" – 3:01
 "Celebration" – 3:15
 "Celebration" (video)

 CD single
 "Chihuahua" – 3:01
 "Chihuahua" (2002 XNT remix) – 3:17

 CD maxi
 "Chihuahua" (radio version) – 2:57
 "Chihuahua" (XTN remix) – 3:17
 "Chihuahua" (Original Karaoke) – 2:57
 "Chihuahua" (Mel Merret remix) – 6:03
 "Chihuahua" (Rikki + Daz vs JJ Mason remix) – 5:56

 CD maxi
 "Chihuahua" (radio version) – 2:57
 "Chihuahua" (XTN remix) – 3:17
 "Chihuahua" (Original Karaoke) – 2:57
 "No More Pain" – 4:22
 "Angel" DJ BoBo with Patricia Manterola – 3:22

 CD maxi
 "Chihuahua" (radio edit) – 2:57
 "Chihuahua" (XTN remix) – 3:17
 "Chihuahua" (Mel Merrett remix) – 6:03
 "Chihuahua" (Rikki & Dazz remix) – 5:55

 CD maxi
 "Chihuahua"		
 "Chihuahua" (XTN remix)		
 "Chihuahua" (Kon-Chihuahua remix) DJ BoBo featuring DJ Poppo

 12" maxi
 "Chihuahua" (radio version) – 2:57
 "Chihuahua" (XTN remix) – 3:17
			
 CD single – Remixes
 "Chihuahua" (Rikki & Daz radio version) – 3:03
 "Chihuahua" (Rikki & Daz remix) – 5:55

Personnel
 Composed by Ray Gilbert, Louis Oliveira, René Baumann and Axel Breitung
 Lyrics by René Baumann
 Co-produced by Axel Breitung

 Radio edit version + instrumental)
 Arranged, produced and mixed by René Baumann & Axel Breitung at Bishop Studios, Hamburg
 Vocal editing by Kay M. Nickold
 Lyrics controlling by Nancy Baumann

 XTN remix
 Produced by René Baumann and Axel Breitung
 Remixed by Xasqui Ten

 "No More Pain"
 Music and lyrics by René Baumann and Axel Breitung
 Arranged, produced, recorded and mixed by René Baumann and Axel Breitung at Bishop Studios, Hamburg
 Vocals, choir and adlibs by Christiane Eiben, Lesley Bogaert, Anthony Moriah
 Vocal editing by Kay M. Nickold
 Lyrics controlling by Nancy Baumann

 "Angel"
 Music and lyrics by René Baumann, Axel Breitung
 Arranged, produced, recorded and mixed by René Baumann and Axel Breitung at Bishop Studios, Hamburg
 Guitars by Axel Breitung
 Vocals by Patricia Manterola and DJ BoBo
 Vocal editing by Kay M. Nickold
 Lyrics controlling by Nancy Baumann

Charts and sales

Weekly charts

Year-end charts

Certifications

References

2002 songs
2002 singles
2003 singles
DJ BoBo songs
SNEP Top Singles number-one singles
Number-one singles in France
Number-one singles in Hungary
Number-one singles in Spain
Number-one singles in Switzerland
Electro swing songs
Novelty songs
Songs written by DJ BoBo
Songs written by Axel Breitung